Gavira is a surname. Notable people with the surname include:

Adrián Gavira (born 1987), Spanish beach volleyball player
Emilio Gavira (born 1964), Spanish actor
Gonzalo Gavira (1925–2005), Mexican movie sound technician
Pablo Martín Páez Gavira (born 2004), Spanish footballer

See also
Gaviria